Kus may refer to:

Kus, a Persian musical instrument
Kus (god), of herdsmen in Sumerian, Babylonian, and Akkadian mythology
De kus (film), 2004 Dutch film
 Kusasi language (ISO 639 language code kus)

Places
Kus, Bërzhitë, Tirana municipality, Albania
Kus, Kashar, Kashar, Tirana municipality, Albania
Lake Kuş, Turkey
Kulusuk Airport (ICAO airport code KUS), Greenland

See also

Kuş
Kuś
Kûs

CUS (disambiguation)